Sammy R. Williams (born December 14, 1974 in Magnolia, Mississippi) is a former professional American football player who played offensive tackle for four seasons for the Kansas City Chiefs, the Baltimore Ravens, and the San Diego Chargers.

Before Oklahoma, he was a two-year starter for Coffeyville Community College.

References 

1974 births
Living people
People from Magnolia, Mississippi
Players of American football from Mississippi
American football offensive tackles
Coffeyville Red Ravens football players
Oklahoma Sooners football players
Kansas City Chiefs players
Baltimore Ravens players
San Diego Chargers players
Berlin Thunder players
Jacksonville Jaguars players